Lionel Ortíz (born 23 September 1970) is a Puerto Rican boxer. He competed in the men's welterweight event at the 1988 Summer Olympics.

References

1970 births
Living people
Puerto Rican male boxers
Olympic boxers of Puerto Rico
Boxers at the 1988 Summer Olympics
Sportspeople from Ponce, Puerto Rico
Welterweight boxers